Changping of the War, also known as The Battle of Changping, is a Chinese television series based on the events surrounding the Battle of Changping, fought between the states of Qin and Zhao during the Warring States period. The series was produced in 2004 but has yet to be aired on television stations in China.

Cast

 Bao Guo'an as King Zhaoxiang of Qin
 Wei Zi as Bai Qi
 Xu Huanshan as King Huiwen of Zhao
 Gai Lili as Lady Chu
 Wei Zongwan as Wei Ran
 Xie Yuan as Lin Xiangru
 Sun Weimin as Fan Ju
 Xu Zhengyun as Lian Po
 Yan Xiaopin as Queen of Zhao
 Li Nan as Zhao Kuo
 Li Xinyu as Feng Zhu
 Le Jiatong as Zhao Qi
 Yizhen as Bian Chu
 Guo Jing as Bian Yu
 Sun Yucai as Miao Xian
 Guo Weihua as Zhao Sheng
 Geng Sheng as King Xiaocheng of Zhao
 Xu Xiaming as Si Yi
 Chen Zhihui as Lord Xinling

References

External links
  Changping of the War on Sina.com
  Changping of the War on news.xinhuanet.com
  Changping of the War on movie.mtime.com

2004 Chinese television series debuts
Television series set in the Zhou dynasty
Mandarin-language television shows
Chinese historical television series
Television series set in the 3rd century BC